The 2018 season is Sarpsborg 08's 7th season in Eliteserien, following their return to the top level in 2012. It is also their fourth season with Geir Bakke as their manager.

Squad

Transfers

Winter

In:

Out:

Summer

In:

Out:

Competitions

Eliteserien

Results summary

Results by round

Results

Table

Norwegian Cup

Europa League

Qualifying phase

Group stage

Squad statistics

Appearances and goals

|-
|colspan="14"|Players away from Sarpsborg 08 on loan:

|-
|colspan="14"|Players who left Sarpsborg 08 during the season:

|}

Goal scorers

Disciplinary record

References

Sarpsborg 08 FF seasons
Sarpsborg 08
Sarpsborg 08